Russian bandy champion is a title held by the winners of the final of the highest Russian bandy league played each year, currently the Bandy Super League.

The championship is for men's teams. There is also a women's bandy championship.

The Russian championship is seen as a direct continuation of the Soviet Union championship. Many Russian bandy clubs were formed during the Soviet years. Therefore, this list also include the Soviet Union champions until the dissolution of the Soviet Union in 1991.

History
The first national bandy championship in the then Soviet Union was held in 1936 but wasn't resumed for the next 14 years. Starting in 1950, the Soviet Union Bandy Championship became annual and continued to exist up until the 1990-91 season, when mid-season, the Soviet Union was dissolved, so the 1991 champion was instead named Champion of the Commonwealth of Independent States. For the following season, 1991–92, the Russian Bandy League was formed and the champion has since become Russian Champion. The league is ended with a play-off for the Russian Bandy Championship. Starting with the 2011-12 season, the league was rearranged and renamed the Russian Bandy Super League.

Until the 2008-09 season, a bronze game was held, but since then, the third place is shared by the two semi-final losing teams.

List of winners

Soviet Union Champions

Commonwealth of Independent States Champions

Russian Champions

Titles

Number of titles per club

External links
 USSR and Russian bandy champions

Champions
Champions
Champions
Russia
Bandy